The following is a list of awards and nominations received by English actress Helena Bonham Carter.

Major awards

Academy Awards

British Academy of Film and Television Arts

Golden Globe Awards

Emmy Awards

Screen Actors Guild Awards

Other awards

Alliance of Women Film Journalists

Annie Awards

British Independent Film Awards

Broadcasting Press Guild

Comedy Film Awards

Evening Standard British Film Awards

Genie Awards

Irish Film & Television Awards

Italian Online Movie Awards

National Board of Review

National Movie Awards

Satellite Awards

Saturn Awards

Zee Cine Awards

Critics' Awards

Boston Society of Film Critics

Central Ohio Film Critics Association

Chicago Film Critics Association

Critics' Choice Movie Awards

Critics' Choice Television Awards

Dallas–Fort Worth Film Critics Association

Denver Film Critics Society

Detroit Film Critics Society

Houston Film Critics Society

Iowa Film Critics

Kansas City Film Critics Circle

Las Vegas Film Critics Society

London Film Critics' Circle

Los Angeles Film Critics Association

National Society of Film Critics

New York Film Critics Circle

North Texas Film Critics Association

Online Film Critics Society

Phoenix Film Critics Society

San Diego Film Critics Society

Society of Texas Film Critics Awards

Southeastern Film Critics Association

St. Louis Gateway Film Critics Association

Toronto Film Critics Association

Washington D.C. Area Film Critics Association

Festival Awards

Beijing Film Festival Awards

Boston Film Festival

Fantasporto: International Fantasy Film Awards

Hollywood Film Festival Awards

Santa Barbara International Film Festival

Tokyo International Film Festival

Audience Awards

Empire Awards

IGN Movie Awards

MTV Movie & TV Awards

Nickelodeon Kids' Choice Awards

People's Choice Awards

Scream Awards

References

External links
 

Bonham Carter, Helena